The Pattern on the Stone: The Simple Ideas that Make Computers Work is a book by W. Daniel Hillis, published in 1998 by Basic Books.  The book attempts to explain concepts from computer science in layman's terms by metaphor and analogy.

The book moves from Boolean algebra through topics such as information theory, parallel computing, cryptography, algorithms, heuristics, universal computing, Turing machines, and promising technologies such as quantum computing and emergent systems.

External links
 Reviews: The Pattern on the Stone from Goodreads

Computer science books
1998 non-fiction books